Tetramicra canaliculata is a species of orchids in the subtribe Laeliinae. It is found in Florida, Hispaniola, Puerto Rico, Trinidad and the Lesser Antilles. It is the type species of its genus.

References

External links 
  
 
 Tetramicra canaliculata at the World Checklist of Selected Plant Families

Laeliinae
Orchids of the Caribbean
Orchids of Florida
Plants described in 1918
Flora without expected TNC conservation status